Statistics of Primera Fuerza in season 1912–13.

Overview
It was contested by 6 teams, and México FC won the championship.

League standings

Top goalscorers
Players sorted first by goals scored, then by last name.

References
Mexico - List of final tables (RSSSF)

1912-13
Mex
1912–13 in Mexican football